Muhammad Hanif Farhan bin Azman (born 2 November 2000) is a Bruneian professional footballer who plays for DPMM FC of the Singapore Premier League as a midfielder.

Club career
Hanif started his football development with Tabuan Muda, the youth team assembled by the National Football Association of Brunei Darussalam (NFABD) for international tournaments. He was placed in the 'A' team that played in the 2017–18 Brunei Super League, finishing sixth in the league with a personal record of six goals from left midfield.

Hanif signed for Kasuka FC in the first half of the 2018–19 season, along with fellow Young Wasp compatriots Hanif Aiman Adanan, Adi Shukry Salleh and Alinur Rashimy Jufri. He scored his first goal for Kasuka on his debut in an 11–0 demolition of Setia Perdana FC on 28 October 2018. He added to his tally two months later in a 1–1 draw with MS PDB.

When DPMM FC held tryouts for a secondary team to play in the domestic league, Hanif grasped the opportunity and as a result was signed for the 2019 Brunei Premier League. He scored the winning goal against Rainbow FC on 19 February to propel DPMM towards the championship at the expense of Tabuan Muda. They were crowned as Brunei Premier League champions on 26 February after a 1–1 draw with said rivals. In the Brunei FA Cup however, they were unceremoniously dumped at the round of 16 by Kota Ranger FC, despite Hanif getting in the scoresheet.

At the start of 2020, head coach Adrian Pennock invited Hanif for trials with the first team and was largely impressed by what he saw. A month later, Hanif signed a contract to play for the main squad to compete in the 2020 Singapore Premier League, while converted into a central midfield role for his tenacity. He debuted on the starting eleven in DPMM FC's first match of the season at home to Tampines Rovers on 6 March, emerging victorious with a 2–0 score. It would be the only match DPMM would play for their 2020 season before withdrawing from the competition due to traveling issues exacerbated by the COVID-19 pandemic.

On 4 July 2021, Hanif scored his first senior DPMM goal in a 15–0 victory over Rimba Star FC. A year later, Hanif obtained a FA Cup winner's medal when his team claimed victory over Kasuka FC in the final of the 2022 Brunei FA Cup.

International career
Hanif travelled with Tabuan Muda for the September 2017 AFF U-18 Youth Championship tournament held in Myanmar. The Young Wasps made a good start by beating the Philippines 3–2, but would lose heavily in subsequent matches against Vietnam, Myanmar and Indonesia. A month later the same squad embarked for South Korea for the 2018 AFC U-19 Championship qualification matches, placed with Indonesia, South Korea, Malaysia and Timor-Leste. Brunei at that time only managed one point after a 2–2 draw with Timor-Leste.

In June 2018, Hanif was in the Tabuan Muda squad for the 2018 AFF U-19 Youth Championship, hosted by Indonesia. The team eventually placed last in their group. Hanif was the provider of the only Brunei goal in the tournament in their last game, scored by Rahimin Abdul Ghani in a 7–1 loss to Myanmar.

Hanif's next excursion with the Young Wasps was to Vietnam for the 2020 AFC U-23 Championship qualification in late March 2019. He was a substitute in their opening match against the hosts which finished 6–0. He made the starting eleven for the other two matches against Thailand and Indonesia that also ended in defeats. Towards the end of the same year, he was selected for the 30th SEA Games football tournament in the Philippines. He played four games overall in a pretty forgettable tournament for Brunei, being sent off for two bookable offences against Singapore in the last group match.

In October 2020, he was selected for the Brunei national football team for the first time.

Honours

DPMM
Brunei Premier League: 2019
Brunei FA Cup : 2022

References

External links

2000 births
Living people
Association football midfielders
Bruneian footballers
DPMM FC players